Stadion Zürich is a planned stadium in Zurich, Switzerland. It will be the home stadium of FC Zürich and Grasshopper Club Zürich, replacing the Hardturm stadium which was closed in September 2007.

An initial project was announced in 2003 and should have been ready for Euro 2008. It was backed by the City of Zurich and Credit Suisse. The multi-use stadium would have had a capacity of 30,000 people. In September 2003, the voters of the city of Zurich approved a credit of 47.7 million Swiss francs for its construction. The project was delayed by various legal proceedings.

In June 2009, it was announced the initial project was dropped and a smaller football stadium with a capacity of 20,000 was planned for 2014–2015. However, this latter project was turned down by a public referendum, in which 50.8% of the voters said no to the new stadium. 

In November 2018 there will be another public referendum over a new stadium on the area of the old Hardturm stadium. Projekt Ensemble, as it is called, is combining a stadium with a capacity 20,000 with two skyscraper and a cooperative settlement.

References

Football venues in Switzerland
Proposed stadiums

Sports venues in Zürich